Yoroa taylori is a species of comb-footed spider in the family Theridiidae. It is found in Queensland.

The species was discovered in northern Queensland, the authors describing a new species and revising a previously monotypic genus.

References

Theridiidae
Spiders described in 2000
Spiders of Australia